James Barnes-Miller (born 31 August 1989) is a British snowboarder from Isle of Thanet. He competes in snowboarding events for athletes with upper limb disabilities after being born with an incomplete right arm.
He participated at the 2018 Winter Paralympics,

He won the bronze medal in the men's dual banked slalom SB-UL event at the 2021 World Para Snow Sports Championships held in Lillehammer, Norway. Barnes-Miller and Ollie Hill also won the bronze medal in the men's team event.

References

External links
 

1989 births
Living people
British male snowboarders
People from Royal Tunbridge Wells
Snowboarders at the 2022 Winter Paralympics
20th-century British people
21st-century British people